Edward af Sillén (born 1982 in Blumenau, Santa Catarina, Brazil) is a Swedish screenwriter and director for stage, film and TV. He has translated and directed many highly successful theatre shows including Twelfth Night by William Shakespeare, The Drowsy Chaperone, Bull and Cock by Mike Bartlett, Torch Song Trilogy by Harvey Fierstein, Shirley Valentine by Willy Russell and Art by Yasmina Reza.

Af Sillén has worked on the Eurovision Song Contest as a director, commentator and screenwriter, including 2016 where he co-wrote and directed the globally acclaimed interval act "Love, Love, Peace, Peace" with Fredrik Kempe, while also directing and writing for Sweden’s most popular television show Melodifestivalen. Following on from writing his first film Medicinen, his second writing En underbar jävla jul became the biggest Swedish film of 2015. In 2019 he directed En del av mitt hjärta (A Piece of My Heart), a major jukebox musical film based the music of Tomas Ledin, lead by Malin Åkerman which was nominated for the Audience Award at The Guldbagge Awards.

Career 

Edward started his career as an actor. Performing both at the Lorensbergsteatern and Stockholm National Theatre. Aged 18, he did stand-up comedy. Hungry to work in the creative side of entertainment and theatre, he knew he could get his foot in the door as an actor.

Film 
2014 saw Af Sillén write his first feature film Medicinen. Based on the 2009 book of the same name, written by Hans Koppel (pseudonym Petter Lidbeck). The book was reworked into a screenplay by Af Sillén and his writing partner Daniel Réhn. An all-star cast including Ewa Fröling and Maria Lundqvist, was led by Helena Bergström.

Af Sillén’s second film was the Swedish comedy En underbar jävla jul, wrote again with Daniel Réhn. Starring Swedish acting legends Robert Gustafsson, Maria Lundqvist and Helena Bergström. Seen by 77,736 people during its premiere weekend, it broke records with the biggest opening for a Swedish film in 2015. It went on to become the most popular Swedish film of 2015. And has grossed over $8 million at the box office. The film won Film of the Year at the QX Gaygala 2016.

In December 2019, Af Sillén directed and released his third, and biggest, feature film. En del av mitt hjärta (A Piece of My Heart) is a jukebox musical based upon the music of one of Sweden's biggest selling artists Tomas Ledin. Lead by Malin Akerman playing Isabella, a lead business woman in the financial district of Stockholm, who returns home to celebrate her father's birthday.

Af Sillén will return to cinema direction in his upcoming film Ett sista race, which he also wrote the script for. Working once again with Malin Akerman and David Hellenius. The Swedish car action comedy is based the Norwegian hit movie Børning.

Theatre 
Af Sillén’s theatrical work includes Swedish translations of Steel Magnolias, Torch Song Trilogy by Harvey Fierstein, Rock of Ages and The Ladykillers. He directed Shakespeare’s Twelfth Night, the play V.D. and the musical Hair at Stockholm’s National Theatre. His direction of Priscilla the Musical was followed by his translation and direction of the Tony Award winning musical The Drowsy Chaperone in 2015. That same year Af Sillén directed. as well as translated the plays Rumors and the Laurence Olivier Award winner Cock.

Af Sillén has written and directed national tours for major Swedish artists such as Tomas Ledin, Ola Salo and Peter Jöback. He teamed up with Alcazar to create their first full production concert. Disco Defenders was a greatest hits residency which début in the Rondo at Lisberg, Gothenburg Summer 2015. The production moved to Hamburger Börs, Stockholm in Winter 2015. After another sell out run, the group took the show on a national tour then returned to Hamburger Börs in 2016.

Television 
2004 brought Af Sillén's screen writing breakthrough with the script for host Maria Lundqvist at the Guldbagge Awards, the Swedish equivalent of the Academy Awards. He returned in 2007 not only as Sissela Kyle’s scriptwriter, but as director of the show live on SVT.

Af Sillén was recruited by Melodifestivalen supervisor Christer Björkman to write and direct the 2009 contest. His mix of humour, music and sparkle saw him return in 2010, 2012 and 2013. After a two year contest break, he came back in 2016 to much acclaim. His parody sketch song Här står jag by Charlotte Perrelli performed that year topped the Swedish iTunes chart. To boost declining viewer figures, Af Sillén was hired as a consultant for the 2019 contest.

After a lifelong love of the contest, Af Sillén became the Swedish commentator in 2009 for SVT. The following year he wrote his first Eurovision Song Contest for Oslo 2010. His commentary continued until 2012 when Loreen won the competition for Sweden. The following year Af Sillén wrote and directed the 58th Eurovision in Malmö 2013. In 2015 he was asked by the BBC to co-write the script of the Eurovision's Greatest Hits hosted by Graham Norton and Petra Mede for a celebration of Eurovision’s 60th year.

2016 brought again the role of writer and director for Eurovision in Stockholm 2016 which featured the musical number "Love Love Peace Peace" performed by hosts Petra Mede and Måns Zelmerlöw. The Independent named it the "ultimate interval act, somehow even upstaging Justin Timberlake himself". Buzzfeed said the presenters were the "best thing about this year's contest".

In 2021 Af Sillén took on a brand new role as a Judge on the 11th and 12th series of TV4's Talang, the Swedish version of the Got Talent franchise.

Personal life 
Edward af Sillén is openly gay. Born in Brazil he was adopted by a Swedish father and an American mother.

Work

Film

Theatre

Television

Eurovision Commentary

Accolades

Guldbagge Awards

QX Gaygala

References

External links

Swedish film directors
Swedish male screenwriters
Male television writers
Gay screenwriters
Swedish theatre directors
Musical theatre directors
1982 births
Living people
Swedish nobility
Swedish LGBT screenwriters
Swedish adoptees
Swedish people of Brazilian descent
Brazilian emigrants to Sweden
People from Blumenau